Hucuktlis Lake (pronounced "who chook-tlis"), formerly Henderson Lake, is a lake on Vancouver Island that drains south into head of Uchucklesaht Inlet on the north side of lower Alberni Inlet.

Etymology
Hucuktlis means "place way inside", which refers to the inland nature of the lake relative to Uchucklesit Inlet. The Uchucklesaht traditionally used this lake as well as the lands and mountains around the lake for their spiritual practices.

History
In 1917, Henderson Lake was adopted as the official name of the lake, correcting a map error featured in a 1912 map of the region.

In 2018, the official name of the lake was changed to Hucuktlis Lake upon the recommendation of the Uchucklesaht First Nation. The name change was supported by the Alberni-Clayoquot Regional District.

Geography
The lake is located about 25 kilometres east-southeast of Port Alberni along the West Coast of Vancouver Island. Clemens Creek flows into the northern tip of the lake. The Hucuktlis River drains the lake into the northern end of Uchucklesit Inlet, an arm of Alberni Inlet.

Climate
Weather data from the Hucuktlis Lake fish hatchery shows that the lake is situated in the wettest place in North America. Hucuktlis Lake averages  of precipitation, and in 1997  fell, setting the all-time Canadian record.

See also
Weather extremes in Canada
Wettest places on Earth

References

Alberni Valley
Lakes of Vancouver Island
Clayoquot Land District